Alqchin-e Sofla (also Romanized as Alqchīn-e Soflá; also known as Alqchīn-e Pā’īn) is a village in Alqchin Rural District, in the Central District of Charam County, Kohgiluyeh and Boyer-Ahmad Province, Iran. At the 2006 census, its population was 800, in 155 families.

References 

Populated places in Charam County